Boogardie Station is a pastoral lease that operates as a sheep station in Western Australia.

It has in its area Boogardie quarry, and is situated away from the location of the  ghost town Boogardie.

Robert Austin traversed the area as part of an expedition in 1854, reporting it as a fine goldfield and good grazing country. The Jones family established the station in about 1880.

In 2011 the property was held by brothers David, Paul, Henry and John Jones who are all descendants of the Jones family that originally settled the property. The station's sheep flock had contracted to about 7,000 head of sheep after several dry seasons.

See also
List of ranches and stations
List of pastoral leases in Western Australia

References

Mid West (Western Australia)
Pastoral leases in Western Australia
Stations (Australian agriculture)
1880 establishments in Australia